The pale-headed jacamar (Brachygalba goeringi) is a species of bird in the family Galbulidae. It is found in Colombia and Venezuela.

Taxonomy and systematics

The pale-headed jacamar is monotypic. It and the dusky-backed (B. salmoni), brown (B. lugubris), and white-throated jacamars (B. albogularis) form a superspecies.

Description

The male's crown, nape, and shoulders are ashy brown. The rest of the upper parts are dark brown glossed with greenish; they look blue-black when worn. It has a pale supercilium and a buffy-white throat. It has a chestnut band on the upper belly and dark brown flanks; the rest of the underparts are white. The female is almost identical. The juvenile has a gray crown and nape, and the upper parts are brighter and the green gloss stronger.

Distribution and habitat

The pale-headed jacamar is found from Arauca and Casanare Departments in Colombia north through northwestern Venezuela at least to Lara. It primarily inhabits the edges of gallery and secondary forest in llanos grasslands. In elevation it ranges as high as  but is usually found much lower.

Behavior

Feeding

The pale-headed jacamar's diet is insects, mostly Lepidoptera and Odonata. It often perches on emergent branches in pairs or small family groups and sallies from there to catch its flying prey.

Breeding

The pale-headed jacamar nests in burrows in earth banks. Nesting has been noted in Venezuela during April and May.

Vocalization

The pale-headed jacamar's song is a series of high "weet" notes that increase in speed and pitch and ends with a trill .

Status

The IUCN has assessed the pale-headed jacamar as being of Least Concern. It is "[c]ommon throughout its range..." and "[n]o specific threats [are] documented so far, despite overall habitat loss in certain areas as a result of deforestation.

References

External links
Pale-headed jacamar videos on the Internet Bird Collection
Pale-headed jacamar photo gallery VIREO Photo-Medium Res
Photo; Article home.scarlet.be
Picture; Article classicnatureprints

Brachygalba
Birds of Venezuela
Birds of Colombia
Birds described in 1869
Taxa named by Philip Sclater
Taxa named by Osbert Salvin
Taxonomy articles created by Polbot